Hunter × Hunter is a Japanese manga series written and illustrated by Yoshihiro Togashi.

Hunter × Hunter or Hunter Hunter may also refer to:

 Hunter × Hunter (1999 TV series), an adaptation by Nippon Animation
 Hunter × Hunter (2011 TV series), an adaptation by Madhouse
 Hunter × Hunter: Phantom Rouge, a 2013 film adaptation
 Hunter × Hunter: The Last Mission, a 2013 film adaptation

See also
 Hunter Hunter (film), a 2020 Canadian-American film.